Mampali was a dynastic title in medieval Georgia (late 8th-10th centuries), usually held by high-ranking Bagratid princes of Tao-Klarjeti who did not possess any Byzantine dignities. It is compound of the words მამა (mama, "father"), and უფალი (upali, "lord"). The following Bagratid princes held the title of mampali:

Guaram Mampali (died 882)
Gurgen I Mampali (c. 870–891)
Sumbat I Mampali (c. 870–889)
Bagrat I Mampali (889–900)
David Mampali (889–943)

References 

Bagrationi dynasty of Tao-Klarjeti 
Medieval Georgia (country)
Noble titles of Georgia (country)
Georgian words and phrases